Longmen may refer to:

Longmen (mythology), The Dragon Gate in Chinese mythology, located at the top of a waterfall cascading from a legendary mountain
Longmen Grottoes, collection of Buddhist cave art in Luoyang
Longmen Mountains, mountain range in Sichuan
Dragon Gate Taoism, also known as the Longmen lineage
Longmen County, Guangdong

Township-level administrative divisions in China
Longmen Town:

 Longmen, Anxi County, Fujian
 Longmen, Chongqing, in Liangping County
 Longmen, Guangdong, in Leizhou
 Longmen, Hainan, in Ding'an County
 Longmen, Henan, in Luolong District, Luoyang
 Longmen, Pingjiang (龙门镇), a town in Pingjiang County, Hunan province.
 Longmen, Jiangxi, in Yongxin County
 Longmen, Lintao County, Gansu
 Longmen, Mianyang, in Fucheng District, Mianyang, Sichuan
 Longmen, Nanchong, in Gaoping District, Nanchong, Sichuan
 Longmen, Pubei County, in Pubei County, Guangxi
 Longmen, Shaanxi, in Hancheng
 Longmen, Zhejiang, in Fuyang District, Hangzhou, Zhejiang

Longmen Township:

 Longmen Township, Anhui, in Huangshan District, Huangshan City
 Longmen Township, Emeishan, Sichuan
 Longmen Township, Gansu, in Lingtai County
 Longmen Township, Guangxi, in Daxin County
 Longmen Township, Hebei, in Laishui County
 Longmen Township, Lezhi County, Sichuan
 Longmen Township, Meigu County, Sichuan
 Longmen Township, Qinghai, in Tian'e County
 Longmen Township, Ya'an, in Lushan County, Sichuan
 Longmen Township, Yunnan, in Yongping County

Longmen Subdistrict:

 Longmen Subdistrict, Longjing, Jilin
 Longmen Subdistrict, Longyan, in Xinluo District, Longyan, Fujian
 Longmen Subdistrict, Pingyuan County, Shandong

See also
Dragon Gate (disambiguation)